Lego Minifigures Online was a massively multiplayer online game developed and published by Funcom, which was released on 29 June 2015. The game was based on the Lego Minifigures theme, allowing the player to unlock, and to play, as various characters from the theme, while also incorporating elements from classic Lego themes, such as castle, and space, and also involving new themes, like mythology. In addition to unlocking new minifigures through normal gameplay, the player was able to unlock minifigures by purchasing physical Lego Minifigures blind bags, which contain special codes that, once entered, allowed the character to be unlocked instantly. All online services for the game were shut down on 30 September 2016.

Gameplay 
The game took inspiration from both classic isometric role-playing video games, and modern Lego video games. The player could click to move their character, and attack enemies, also to smash and build Lego objects. The player could have up to three minifigures to quickly swap between while playing, and could also open their inventory to change which three they had immediate access to. Minifigures could also be leveled up with experience points, to improve their abilities. The game contained numerous themed worlds, accessed from a hub, with each world containing multiple dungeons to raid. The player was also able to battle against other players, in teams.

Minifigures 
The characters included in the game were some of the minifigures from the Lego Minifigures series. As of September 2014, several minifigures were available for purchase for use in the game through 6 and 10 month memberships, but were made completely available when the game was fully released as a pay-to-play title, on 29 June 2015.

Development 
Lego Minifigures Online was first announced on 29 August 2013 as a free-to-play title. The game underwent a beta testing phase, and was made public for Microsoft Windows, OS X, and Linux, on 29 October 2014. On 29 June 2015, the game was fully released, although as a pay-to-play title, for Microsoft Windows, OS X, Linux, iOS, and Android.

Due to the game's failure to meet Funcom's internal revenue forecasts, Lego Minifigures Online was shut down, on 30 September 2016.

References

External links 
 

2015 video games
Android (operating system) games
IOS games
Minifigures Online
Linux games
MacOS games
Massively multiplayer online games
Video games developed in Norway
Windows games
Inactive massively multiplayer online games
Funcom games